National Route 172 is a national highway of Japan connecting Minato-ku, Osaka and Chūō-ku, Osaka in Japan, with a total length of 8 km (4.97 mi).

References

National highways in Japan
Roads in Osaka Prefecture